Vito Ventura (born 10 December 1987), known professionally as Shade, is an Italian rapper, singer and voice actor.

In 2013 he won the second edition of the freestyle battle show MTV Spit and debuted with the studio album Mirabilansia (Warner Music Italy) in 2015.

Together with Federica Carta, he participated at the Sanremo Music Festival 2019 with the song "Senza farlo apposta".

As a voice actor, he dubbed in Italian several films, TV series and anime, most notably Sonny Wright in Inazuma Eleven: Ares, Ugly Dog (Pitbull) in UglyDolls, and L (Ken'ichi Matsuyama) in the live-action film Death Note and its sequels.

Discography

Studio albums 
 Mirabilansia (2015)
 Clownstrofobia (2016)
 Truman (2018)

Singles 
 "Cambiare stato" (2014)
 "Mai una gioia" (2015)
 "Se i rapper fossero noi" feat. Fred De Palma (2015)
 "Stronza bipolare" (2016)
 "Odio le hit estive" (2016)
 "Bene ma non benissimo" (2017)
 "Irraggiungibile" feat. Federica Carta (2017)
 "Amore a prima insta" (2018)
 "Figurati noi" feat. Emma Muscat (2018)
 "Senza farlo apposta" with Federica Carta (2019)
 "La hit dell'estate" (2019)
 "Allora ciao" (2020)
 "Autostop" (2020)
 "In'un ora" (2021)

References

Italian rappers
Italian male voice actors
Living people
21st-century Italian  male singers
1987 births
Musicians from Turin